Selma Diamond (August 5, 1920 – May 13, 1985) was a Canadian-born American comedian, actress, and radio and television writer, known for her high-range, raspy voice and her portrayal of Selma Hacker on the first two seasons of the NBC television comedy series Night Court. Diamond was also the main inspiration for the character of Sally Rogers on the classic situation comedy The Dick Van Dyke Show.

Early life 
Diamond was born on August 5, 1920, in London, Ontario, Canada, to a tailor and his wife. They moved when Diamond was a young girl to Brooklyn, New York City, New York.

Diamond attended high school in Brooklyn and graduated from New York University.

Career
Diamond published cartoons and humor essays in The New Yorker.  Later, she moved to the West Coast and hired an agent. She worked in radio and, eventually, television. Her first radio writing credit was in 1943 on Blue Ribbon Town with Groucho Marx. That initial credit turned into a 65-week tenure with Marx's show and a longer friendship with him. She also wrote for the Camel Caravan with Jimmy Durante and Garry Moore, The Drene Show with Rudy Vallee, Duffy's Tavern, and The Kenny Baker Show.

Diamond wrote for the radio version of The Adventures of Ozzie and Harriet for 20 weeks. She left that show in 1950 and became one of the staff hired by comedy writer Goodman Ace (who had previously hired her for some work on Danny Kaye's 1940s radio show) for The Big Show (1950–1952), the 90-minute weekly program hosted by actress Tallulah Bankhead. Considered one of the last great variety shows of the classic old time radio era, this Sunday night comedy marathon featured some of the biggest entertainers of the era. In 1951-1952, Diamond collaborated with cartoonist Gill Fox, writing for his "Jeanie" comic strip that ran daily in the New York Herald Tribune.

Diamond moved to television as one of the writers for Sid Caesar and Imogene Coca's Your Show of Shows. While writing for another Caesar vehicle, Caesar's Hour, Diamond earned an Emmy nomination. She also worked for Ace once again, writing for Perry Como's Kraft Music Hall television series. In 1953, she wrote for Milton Berle's TV show.

Carl Reiner said that he had Diamond in mind when he created Sally Rogers as a character in The Dick Van Dyke Show. Diamond was not always taken seriously by her writing peers. Bob Schiller, who had also written for Duffy's Tavern and The Adventures of Ozzie and Harriet, told author Jordan R. Young (for The Laugh Crafters), "The jury is still out on whether Selma was a comedy writer. She was really a very interesting character—salty, and she was—exactly what you saw on camera is what she was." In 1961, Diamond said about being the only female in a group of five writers for the Como show: "They feel handicapped, not me." At another time, she said, "It's like being Red China. I'm there. They just don't recognize me."

In 1960, she released a comedy album based on her humorous conversational style, Selma Diamond Talks...and Talks and Talks and Talks... (Carleton LPX 5001). In 1970, she wrote the book Nose Jobs for Peace, published by Prentice-Hall.

By the 1960s and 1970s, Diamond was familiar as a frequent guest on The Jack Paar Show and The Tonight Show Starring Johnny Carson, and she made numerous film appearances, including Stanley Kramer's comedy It's a Mad, Mad, Mad, Mad World (as the unseen telephone voice of Spencer Tracy's wife, Ginger Culpepper), Bang the Drum Slowly (as hotel switchboard operator Tootsie), and All of Me (as Margo). In 1982, she appeared in My Favorite Year with a memorable small role as wardrobe mistress for King Kaiser's Comedy Calvalcade, a fictional show which clearly echoed the time and venue of her work for Sid Caesar. She was also a semi-regular for four seasons of the Ted Knight comedy series Too Close For Comfort.

In addition to her writing, Diamond performed as an actress, making her debut in a summer touring version of Bye, Bye Birdie. Her other work in summer stock productions included Come Blow Your Horn and Barefoot in the Park. On television, she portrayed Selma Hacker on Night Court in 1984 and 1985 for which she received her second Emmy nomination, and she portrayed Mildred on Too Close for Comfort. Films in which she appeared included All of Me, Bang the Drum Slowly, It's a Mad, Mad, Mad, Mad World, and My Favorite Year.

Death
Diamond died of lung cancer on May 13, 1985, at Cedars-Sinai Medical Center in Los Angeles, aged 64.

She was buried in Hillside Memorial Park in Culver City, Los Angeles County, California.

Filmography

Film

Television

References

External links

 
 

1920 births
1985 deaths
Actresses from New York City
American cartoonists
American comedy writers
American film actresses
American radio writers
American television actresses
American television writers
American voice actresses
American women comedians
American women television writers
Artists from New York City
Burials at Hillside Memorial Park Cemetery
Canadian cartoonists
Canadian comedy writers
Canadian emigrants to the United States
Canadian television actresses
Comedians from New York City
Deaths from lung cancer in California
Jewish American actresses
New York University alumni
People from Brooklyn
People from Ontario
The New Yorker cartoonists
Women radio writers
Writers from New York City
20th-century American actresses
20th-century American comedians
20th-century American screenwriters
20th-century American women writers
20th-century American Jews